Etheostoma duryi, the black darter, is a species of darter endemic to the eastern United States, where it occurs in the drainage of the Tennessee River in the states of Tennessee, Georgia, and Alabama. It is an inhabitant of rocky pools in streams and smaller rivers and their adjacent riffles. The specific epithet honors Charles Dury (1847-1931), who collected the original type specimens.

References

duryi
Fish described in 1889